Alexander Golling (August 2, 1905 – February 26, 1989) was a German actor.  Golling was a member of the Nazi Party.

Selected filmography

 Der stählerne Strahl (1935) - Zöger
 Joan of Arc (1935) - English Knight
 The Private Life of Louis XIV (1935) - General Mélac
 One Too Many on Board (1935) - Kommissar Sörensen
 The Call of the Jungle (1936) - William Edwards
 Michel Strogoff (1936) - Iwan Ogareff
 The Kaiser of California (1936) - Kewen - Bürgermeister von San Franzisko
 Ninety Minute Stopover (1936) - Conny Steven
 Men Without a Fatherland (1937) - Ischnikoff
 The Tiger of Eschnapur (1938) - Prinz Ramigani, Vetter des Maharadscha
 The Indian Tomb (1938) - Prinz Ramigani, Vetter des Maharadscha
 Travelling People (1938) - Ganove Tino
 Sergeant Berry (1938) - Evans
 Dreizehn Mann und eine Kanone (1938)
 Gold in New Frisco (1939) - Jim de Lacy
 Comrades (1941) - Marschall Davout
 Geheimakte W.B.1 (1942) - Wilhelm Bauer
 Chased by the Devil (1950) - Martin Karper
 Immortal Beloved (1951) - Wulf von Hollstein
 Prosecutor Corda (1953) - Gerichtspräsident
 The Little Town Will Go to Sleep (1954) - Bürgermeister
 School for Marriage (1954) - Boris Salmon
 Hochstaplerin der Liebe (1954) - Kriminalrat Dr. Maurer
 Ball of Nations (1954) - Scrjabin
 The Golden Plague (1954) - Hamann
 Hello, My Name is Cox (1955) - Gangster Toop
 The Major and the Bulls (1955) - Landrat Spiegel
 Der Teufel mit den drei goldenen Haaren (1955)
 In Hamburg When the Nights Are Long (1956)
 The Golden Bridge (1956) - Bessing
 Santa Lucia (1956) - Bärtiger
 Two Bavarians in St. Pauli (1956) - Hieronymous Huber
 Queen Louise (1957) - Großfürst Konstantin
 Gangsterjagd in Lederhosen (1959) - Ramiro
 A Summer You Will Never Forget (1959) - Konsul Leuchtenthal
 My Schoolfriend (1960) - Krögelmeier
 Soldatensender Calais (1960) - Ein Gauleiter
 No Shooting Time for Foxes (1966) - An Uncle
 Hurra, die Schule brennt - Die Lümmel von der ersten Bank IV. Teil (1969) - Blaumeier
 Das Glöcklein unterm Himmelbett (1970) - Johann Baptist Kloiber
 All People Will Be Brothers (1973) - Bauer
 The Hunter of Fall (1974) - Grenzbauer
 The Odessa File (1974) - Colonel
 Karl May (1974) - Fischer
  (1977) - Kommerzienrat

Bibliography
 Hadley, Michael L. Count Not the Dead: The Popular Image of the German Submarine. McGill-Queen's University Press, 1995.
 London, John. Theatre Under the Nazis. Manchester University Press, 2000.

External links

References

1905 births
1989 deaths
German male film actors
Male actors from Munich
Nazi Party members
20th-century German male actors